Dylan Nealis (born July 30, 1998) is an American professional soccer player who plays as a right-back for Major League Soccer club New York Red Bulls.

Career

Youth and Collegiate
Nealis began his career with local club  Massapequa SC. He also played for Massapequa High School. As a sophomore in 2013, Nealis scored the winning goals in both the semi final and final of the 2013 NYSPHSAA Class AA tournament where he was also named MVP.

As a junior in 2014, Nealis' Massapequa team finished undefeated in the regular season.  Their playoff run ended with a 2-0 loss to the Syosset Braves in the Nassau County Class AA tournament. 

In 2016, Nealis began his collegiate soccer career with the Georgetown Hoyas. In 2019, Nealis captained the Georgetown University team that won their first NCAA national championship. Nealis was named the Defensive Most Outstanding Player of the national tournament, becoming the first Hoya to win the honor. During the 2019 season, Nealis was also named a finalist for the MAC Hermann Trophy, an annual award to the top college soccer player in the nation.

During his college years, Nealis also played USL League Two side Long Island Rough Riders.

Professional 
On January 9, 2020, Nealis was selected by Inter Miami CF as the third overall pick in the 2020 MLS SuperDraft. Nealis made his professional debut on September 23, 2020, appearing as a starter in a 1-4 loss to New York Red Bulls. He ended his first season appearing in 20 matches for Inter Miami.

On April 11, 2021, Nealis was traded to Nashville SC in exchange for $175,000 in general allocation money and an additional $50,000 if he was to meet certain performance-based metrics. On April 24, 2021, Nealis made his debut with Nashville, appearing an injury-time substitute in a 2-2 draw with CF Montréal. On July 17, 2021, he started his first match for the club, recording an assist in a 5-1 victory over Chicago Fire FC.

On December 16, 2021, Nealis was traded to New York Red Bulls in exchange for $175,000 in general allocation money and an additional $75,000 if he was to meet certain performance-based metrics. On February 26, 2022, Nealis made his debut for New York, appearing as a starter in a 3-1 victory over San Jose Earthquakes in the opening match of the season. On May 25, 2022, Nealis scored his first goal as a professional in a 3-1 victory for New York over Charlotte FC as his team advanced to the quarterfinals of the 2022 U.S. Open Cup.

Personal life 
Nealis has three older brothers who all played soccer. His oldest brother, Jimmy, also played college soccer at Georgetown University and played professionally for the New York Cosmos. Nealis' older brother, Sean played collegiate soccer for Hofstra University and is currently a defender for the New York Red Bulls. His brother, Connor, played for Binghamton University.

Career statistics

Club

Honors

Individual 
 Big East Conference Men's Soccer Defender of the Year: 2018, 2019
 NCAA Division I Men's Soccer Tournament Most Outstanding Defensive Player: 2019
 MAC Hermann Trophy Finalist: 2019

Team 
 NCAA Division I Men's Soccer Tournament: 2019
 Big East Conference Men's Soccer Tournament: 2017, 2018, 2019

References

External links 
 Dylan Nealis at Georgetown Athletics
 Dylan Nealis at USL League Two
 Dylan Nealis at MLS

1998 births
Living people
All-American men's college soccer players
American soccer players
Association football midfielders
Georgetown Hoyas men's soccer players
Inter Miami CF players
Inter Miami CF draft picks
Long Island Rough Riders players
Major League Soccer players
Nashville SC players
NCAA Division I Men's Soccer Tournament Most Outstanding Player winners
New York Red Bulls players
People from Massapequa, New York
Soccer players from New York (state)
Sportspeople from Nassau County, New York
USL League Two players